Greytown Airport  is an airport serving Greytown, a town in the KwaZulu-Natal province in South Africa.

Facilities

References

External links
 

Airports in South Africa
Buildings and structures in KwaZulu-Natal
Transport in KwaZulu-Natal
Umzinyathi District Municipality